Kirkvine Airstrip  is an airstrip serving the city of Mandeville in the Manchester Parish of Jamaica.

There is rising terrain northwest through east. There is a large hill off the end of Runway 33.

See also

Transport in Jamaica
List of airports in Jamaica

References

External links
OpenStreetMap - Kirkvine Airstrip
Bing Maps - Kirkvine Airstrip

Airports in Jamaica